Locktown Baptist Church is a historic church in Locktown (Delaware Township), Hunterdon County, New Jersey, United States.

It was built in 1819 and added to the National Register of Historic Places on February 15, 1974.

See also
National Register of Historic Places listings in Hunterdon County, New Jersey

References

Baptist churches in New Jersey
Churches on the National Register of Historic Places in New Jersey
New Jersey Register of Historic Places
Churches completed in 1819
19th-century Baptist churches in the United States
Churches in Hunterdon County, New Jersey
National Register of Historic Places in Hunterdon County, New Jersey
Delaware Township, Hunterdon County, New Jersey